Tom Angleberger is an American children's writer, best known for the Origami Yoda series. As of March 2013, more than 3.3 million copies of his books had been sold worldwide. Angleberger lives in Virginia with his wife, Cece Bell, who is also a children's author. 

Angleberger is also the author of children's books published under the name Sam Riddleburger.

Personal life

Angleberger and wife Cece Bell met at the College of William & Mary, where they both majored in art. They have two children. Angleberger has Asperger syndrome.

Works 

The Strange Case of Origami Yoda
Darth Paper Strikes Back
Fuzzy
The Secret of the Fortune Wookiee
Art2-D2’s Guide to Folding and Doodling
The Surprise Attack of Jabba the Puppett
Princess Labelmaker to the Rescue! 
Emperor Pickletine Rides the Bus 
Fake Mustache
Crankee Doodle, written by Angleberger and illustrated by Cece Bell (Clarion Books, 2013), 
Poop Fountain!: The Qwikpick Papers 
The Rat with the Human Face: The Qwikpick Papers 
Return of the Jedi: Beware the Power of the Dark Side! 
Rocket and Groot: Stranded on Planet Strip Mall
Rocket and Groot: Keep on Truckin
The Princess and the Pit Stop
The Mighty Chewbacca in the Forest of Fear!
Geronimo Stilton: The Graphic Novel
 Horton Halfpott
McToad Mows Tiny Island, written by Angleberger and illustrated by John Hendrix

As Sam Riddleburger
 Qwikpick Adventure Society (Penguin Dial Books for Young Readers, 2007) – sewage disposal humor 
 Reissued 2014 as The Qwikpick Papers: Poop Fountain! by Angleberger, in print illustrated by Jen Wang (Abrams Amulet Books) and audio read by Mark Turetsky (Recorded Books,  "8 years and up").
 Stonewall Hinkleman and the Battle of Bull Run, by Michael Hemphill and Riddleburger (Dial, 2009) – time travel historical fiction

References

External links

 
 Berger & Burger, blog by Sam T.  Riddleburger (pseudonym) and subsequently Tom Angleberger
 
 Sam Riddleburger at LC Authorities, with 2 records (2007–2009)

Living people
American children's writers
College of William & Mary alumni
Year of birth missing (living people)
Place of birth missing (living people)
People with Asperger syndrome